Pandit Sanjeev Chimmalgi (born 29 July 1972) is an Indian music composer and Hindustani vocalist. He is a disciple of C. R. Vyas. His music reflects the voice culture of Kirana gharana as well as the bandish oriented singing of the Gwalior gharana/ Agra gharana.

Background
Chimmalgi was born in Mumbai to M.V. Chimmalgi, in a family hailing from Dharwad, Karnataka. His grandfather, Chimmalgi Master, was a noted tabla player.

Career
Chimmalgi is professionally trained as a computer engineer. He had his initial training from Madhava Gudi. Later he came under the tutelage of C. R. Vyas. He is also receiving training in Carnatic music under T. R. Balamani and Balachandran in Mumbai and in Konnakol under renowned Mridangam player T S Nandakumar.

He has performed at several venues in Mumbai, Pune, Indore, Kolkata, Miraj, and Nagpur.

Discography
 Quest (2003)
 Remembering Gunijaan: A Tribute to Pandit C R Vyas (2008)
 Runningshaadi.com
 Baahubali 2
 Hindi Medium

Awards and recognition
 2007 - Best male playback singing for the Marathi film 'Aai Shappath'.
 2006 - Nominated for Zee Gaurav Puraskar, V Shantaram Puraskar and Maharashtra Shasan Puraskar
 2005-2006 - Sangeetha Shiromani Award consisting of a citation and Rs 25,000/- cash.
 1995 to 98 - Awarded the National scholarship by the Government of India.
 1993 - Winner of all India youth under-23 competition conducted by All India Radio.

References

External links
Official website
Sanjeev Chimmalgi on Kshitij Group

1972 births
Living people
Hindustani singers
People from Dharwad